88888 Lights Out was a campaign with the stated goal of increasing awareness of global warming and promoting actions to reduce energy consumption. By encouraging India's residents to turn out the lights for eight minutes and to become more aware of environmental concerns, the organisers sought to limit greenhouse gas emissions and reduce pollution of the globe.

Campaign organisation 
The campaign was started by Exnora International, a non-governmental organisation in India. It called for people to switch off their lights for eight minutes at 8 p.m. on August 8, 2008 (8-8-8-8-8) to spread awareness and take action to reduce energy consumption and the resulting environmental damage.

In the city of Chennai, Governor Surjit Singh Barnala ordered the lights off in Raj Bhavan at 8 p.m. for 8 minutes and said that an awakening should be created among the people of all walks of life on the root cause of global warming, it occurred at the very beginning of the 2008 Olympics.

The effort has been part of a wider effort by the groups involved to bring attention to environmental issues.

See also
FLICK OFF
Earth Hour

References

External links
88888 Lights Out 
EXcellent NOvel RAdical (ExNoRa) website 
OneIndia  (Tamil)
Indian Society of Heating, Refrigerating and Air Conditioning Engineers
Chennai City News
"Similar programmes have already been undertaken in countries like Australia, Canada, US, New Zealand, Denmark, Fiji, Philippines, Ireland and Israel. In the UK, residents of London also undertook a similar programme. The people of Mumbai also observed such a programme, added the group." Appeal to switch off lamps for eight minutes today  Aug. 7, 2008 Assam Tribune

Environment of India
Energy conservation
Energy conservation in India
2008 in India